This article documents statistics from the 2003 Rugby World Cup, held in Australia from 10 October to 22 November.

Team statistics
The following table shows the team's results in major statistical categories. No teams were shown a red card during the tournament.

Source: RugbyWorldCup.com

Top point scorers

Source: RugbyWorldCup.com

Top try scorers

Source: RugbyWorldCup.com

Hat-tricks
Unless otherwise noted, players in this list scored a hat-trick of tries.

Stadiums

Attendances

Top 10 highest attendances.

Lowest attendance: 15,457 –  vs , York Park, Launceston, 30 October 2003

See also
 2007 Rugby World Cup statistics
 Records and statistics of the Rugby World Cup
 List of Rugby World Cup hat-tricks

External links
2003 Rugby World Cup Official site (Archived)
Rugby World Cup 2003 Tournament statistics
2003 Rugby World Cup Reports and Statistics

References

Statistics
Rugby union records and statistics